Faithfully is the third studio album by American singer Faith Evans. It was released by Bad Boy Records on November 6, 2001, in the United States. A reflection of her musical studies, Evans was inspired by a variety of classic R&B, pop, rock, and jazz artists such as Chicago, S.O.S. Band, Ella Fitzgerald, and Sarah Vaughn during the production of Faithfully. The result, a sample-heavy album, which the label described as "old school flavored," features production by Mario Winans, Buckwild, Vada Nobles, Michael Angelo Saulsberry, The Neptunes, Battlecat, and others, with material ranging from ballads to dance tracks that built upon the contemporary R&B, funk music and hip-hop genres.

The album earned generally favorable reviews from most critics who called it her best effort yet, though others were critical with its length and the amount of ballads on Faithfully. It received a Grammy Award nomination for Best Contemporary R&B Album and debuted and peaked at number 14 on the US Billboard 200, selling 101,000 copies in its first week, and went on to sell more than 834,000 copies, eventually reaching gold status in the United States. Faithfully spawned four total singles, including "You Gets No Love", "I Love You" and "Burnin' Up." Faithfully was Evans' last album to be recorded under the Bad Boy imprint before her departure in 2003.

Recording
Evans worked closely with her husband and manager Todd Russaw on her third album. Before recording songs, the pair spent a year studying the work of classic R&B, pop, rock, and jazz artists such as Steely Dan, Michael Franks, Chicago, S.O.S. Band, Ella Fitzgerald, Sarah Vaughn and others, sitting around and playing them to learn about their techniques and performances. With her label Bad Boy Records nearing transition from distributor Arista Records to Universal Music and mentor Sean "P. Diddy" Combs being involved in several projects, including his second album Forever (1999), Evans and Russaw started working on new songs their own. After sending them to Combs, he urged them to come to Miami to start recording sessions for the album with him and his team, which Evans called "really enjoyable."

While Combs and in-house producer Mario Winans would craft the majority of the album production, Evans also collaborated with 
Battlecat, Bink, Buckwild, Hozay Clowney, Kip Collins, Havoc, The Neptunes, Vada Nobles, Michaelangelo Saulsberry, and frequent contributor Chucky Thompson on Faithfully. Producer duo Jimmy Jam & Terry Lewis were also asked to contribute to Faithfully but declined after hearing previously produced material which they found too good to come up with better material. While it took almost two years to finish Faithfully, Evans noted in a 2001 interview with MTV News that it reflected her music studies of the past five years, saying: "It took months and months of studying the songs, going back, putting in the elements. The feel is 'Faith has grown.' That's what I hope people get from it. I just been trying to get my history together." The album title borrows from the same-titled album track.

Critical reception

Allmusic editor Stephen Thomas Erlewine called the album "her grittiest, funkiest, best record to date." While he found that it runs too long, Erlewine also noted that "Faithfully gels better than any previous Faith Evans record, in large part because so much of it is devoted to hard-edged, funky dance numbers [...] It is rich with vibrant songs, lively production, and Evans' best singing to date on what ultimately is not just her best album." The Independent declared "Faithfully, by some distance Evans's most impressive album." The newspaper found that "the album has a far broader range than her previous releases," with "Evans's voice [dominating] proceedings." Entertainment Weekly critic Craig Seymour wrote that "on her third and most accomplished album, Evans uses lush ’70s soul orchestrations for her ballads about love’s joys and hardships. Her vocals range from earthy gospel-schooled cries to breathy ethereal coos." Billboard found that Faithfully was "a much stronger project than her previous outing," calling it "flavorful."

Tracey E. Hopkins from Rolling Stone noted "the disc's minimalist, old-school soul production style [that] helps pushing [Evans'] pulpit-honed, honey-glazed vocals to the fore." She felt that "with her third disc, the gospel, jazz and hip-hop sprinkled Faithfully, Evans continues to challenge Blige's now drama-free reign." People remarked that "keeping one foot in both the hip-hop and R&B worlds, Evans uses her gritty, gospel-informed alto to deftly mix components from the street and the church, bringing in guest rappers Loon and P. Diddy for two songs. But when she goes soulfully solo on the jazzy numbers “Do Your Time” and “Love Can’t Hide,” it's clear that this is Evans's party." Christian Ward from NME wrote that Faithfully is "better than we might’ve expected" and called it "half a good album," feeling that the "final stretch is a long haul, everything getting mid-tempo and warbly." Similarly, The Guardians Caroline Sullivan found that Evans "sounds suitably rejuvenated" on the album, "teasing some memorable moments out of a collection of old-school love songs" but also noted that "the let down is the preponderance of generic ballads, most of which are simply unworthy of such a luscious voice."

Commercial performance
Faithfully debuted and peaked at number 14 on the US Billboard 200 chart, selling 101,000 copies in its first week. This marked Evans' highest opening sales up to then. On Billboards component charts, it reached number two on the Top R&B/Hip-Hop Albums chart. In total, Faithfully  sold more than 834,000 copies in the United States. It was eventually certified gold by the Recording Industry Association of America (RIAA) for the shipment of over 500,000 copies.

Track listing
Credits adapted from the liner notes of Faithfully.

Notes
  signifies a vocal producer
  signifies a co-producer

Samples
"Alone in This World" contains a sample from "Who Shot Ya?" by Notorious B.I.G.
"I Love You" contains a sample from "Make a Little Love to Me" by Isaac Hayes.
"Back to Love" contains a sample from "Last Night a D.J. Saved My Life" by Indeep.
"Faithful (Interlude)" contains a sample from "Faithful to the End" by D.J. Rogers.
"Do Your Time" contains a sample from "I Had A Dream" by Hubert Laws.
"Can't Believe" contains a sample from "Phone Tap" by The Firm.
"Don't Cry" contains a sample from "Mainstream" by Outkast.
"Faithfully" contains a sample from "Juicy Fruit" by Mtume.
"Where We Stand" contains a sample from "Never Say Die" by Michael Franks.
"Heaven Only Knows" contains a sample from "That's Alright With Me" by Esther Phillips.

Charts

Weekly charts

Year-end charts

Certifications

Release history

References

External links 
 Faith Evans at MySpace
 
 

2001 albums
Faith Evans albums
Bad Boy Records albums
Albums produced by the Neptunes
Albums produced by Buckwild
Albums produced by Battlecat (producer)
Albums produced by Sean Combs
Albums produced by Havoc (musician)